Mint Street may refer to:

 Mint Street, Chennai, India
 Mint Street, London, England, a remnant of the Liberty of the Mint
 Reserve Bank of India, often known as Mint Street
Mint Street station, in Charlotte, North Carolina, U.S.